Sir Charles Travis Clay  (30 July 1885 – 31 January 1978) was an English librarian and antiquarian who was the librarian of the House of Lords Library from 1922 to 1956.

Early life and education

Clay was born at Rastrick House in Rastrick, near Halifax, Yorkshire, the younger son of historian and genealogist John William Clay and his wife,  Alice Caroline Pilleau. His mother was the daughter of Colonel Henry Pilleau and descended from Pezé Pilleau, the notable Huguenot silversmith. His only brother, Lionel Pilleau Clay, was killed in action in 1918 in the First World War.

He was educated at Harrow School, earning a scholarship for mathematics at Balliol College, Oxford in 1904. After gaining only second-class honours in mathematical moderations, he was able to keep his scholarship but read history. Under the tutelage of Henry William Carless Davis and Arthur Lionel Smith, he took first-class honours in modern history in 1908.

Career
Clay became assistant secretary to the Marquess of Crewe, first at the Colonial Office and then at the India Office. After Sir Edmund Gosse retired in 1914, Lord Crewe, at that time Leader of the House of Lords, recommended Clay as an Assistant Librarian at House of Lords Library. Shortly afterward, he was commissioned into the Royal Devon Yeomanry and sent to France. He rose to the rank of major and was twice mentioned in dispatches.

He succeeded as librarian in 1922, and served approximately three decades in the post while continuing to pursue his passion for genealogy and antiquities, earning a reputation for his expertise in both art and archaeology.

He was a Fellow of the Society of Antiquaries (FSA) for 65 years and vice-president of the society from 1934 to 1938. He also served as honorary vice-president of the Royal Historical Society. He was a member of the Huguenot Society and the Harleian Society as well as the Roxburgh Club for bibliophiles.

In 1943, Clay was awarded an honorary DLitt|[Doctorate of Letters] from the University of Leeds. He was appointed a Companion of the Order of the Bath, civil division, in the 1944 New Year Honours. He was elected a Fellow of the British Academy elected in 1950.

Following his retirement, he was knighted in the 1957 Birthday Honours.

Personal life
In 1913, Clay married the Hon. Alice Violet Robson (1892–1972), daughter of Liberal MP and Attorney General William Snowdon Robson, Baron Robson. She was a life-long Liberal. They had three daughters: Rachel Maxwell-Hyslop (1914–2011), a prominent archaeologist; Dr Diana Franklin Laurenson (1920–1977), who defended her doctoral thesis at the London School of Economics in 1960 and taught at the London Polytechnic; and Rosemary Travis Howarth (1924–2009) who studied and subsequently worked at the Courtauld Institute of Art. All three daughters married and there were eight grandchildren and 14 great grandchildren.

Sir Charles Travis Clay died in Little Tew, Oxfordshire, in 1978.

References

External links 
Papers of Charles T. Clay at the University of Leeds

1885 births
1978 deaths
British Army personnel of World War I
Military personnel from Yorkshire
People from Rastrick
Royal Devon Yeomanry officers
English librarians
English archaeologists
People educated at Harrow School
Alumni of Balliol College, Oxford
Fellows of the Society of Antiquaries of London
Fellows of the British Academy